Euspondylus simonsii, known commonly as Simons's sun tegu, is a species of lizard in the family Gymnophthalmidae. The species is endemic to Peru.

Etymology
The specific name, simonsii, is in honor of American scientific collector Perry O. Simons.

Geographic range
E. simonsii is found in the Department of Huánuco, Peru.

Habitat

Reproduction
E. simonsii is oviparous.

References

Further reading
Boulenger GA (1901). "Further Descriptions of new Reptiles collected by Mr. P. O. Simons in Peru and Bolivia". Annals and Magazine of Natural History, Seventh Series 7: 546–549. (Euspondylus simonsii, new species, p. 549).

Euspondylus
Reptiles of Peru
Endemic fauna of Peru
Reptiles described in 1901
Taxa named by George Albert Boulenger